
This is a list of aircraft in alphabetical order beginning with 'S'.

Sb

SBM Development
 SBM Development RT216

References

Further reading

External links

 List Of Aircraft (S)

de:Liste von Flugzeugtypen/N–S
fr:Liste des aéronefs (N-S)
nl:Lijst van vliegtuigtypes (N-S)
pt:Anexo:Lista de aviões (N-S)
ru:Список самолётов (N-S)
sv:Lista över flygplan/N-S
vi:Danh sách máy bay (N-S)